Presidio Graduate School (Presidio) is a private graduate school in San Francisco, California founded in 2002. It offers MBA and MPA degrees in sustainable development. Presidio offers a formal "green MBA" curriculum centered on environmental sustainability and social justice, to a great extent inspired by John Elkington's triple bottom line. In 2015, The New York Times named Presidio the MBA program to choose "if you want to change the world."

Presidio has a low-residency format with face-to-face classes once a month and remaining classes online. About sixty percent of students are women. It was previously known as Presidio World College and as Presidio School of Management. 

Presidio is accredited by the Western Association of Schools and Colleges through its affiliation with Alliant International University. 

Presidio alumni are well-represented in corporate sustainability across the United States. For instance, Presidians have occupied director of sustainability positions at companies including Salesforce and Facebook.

Presidio presidents have included William Shutkin (2011-2016) and Mark Schulman.

References

External links
 Official website

Business schools in California
Educational institutions established in 2003
Universities and colleges in San Francisco
Alliant International University
Private universities and colleges in California
2003 establishments in California